Michael Chaplin (born 1951 in County Durham) is an English theatre, radio, television and non-fiction writer and former television producer and executive. He grew up in Newcastle upon Tyne where he now lives and works again.

After graduating from Cambridge University in 1973 with a degree in history he trained as a reporter on The Journal newspaper in Newcastle upon Tyne and then became the paper's Health Correspondent.

In 1977 he moved to London, becoming successively a researcher, producer, director and executive producer in London Weekend Television's current affairs and documentaries department. Among his many credits there was as editor of the cult arts/lifestyle show South of Watford which helped to establish the TV careers of its successive presenters, Ben Elton and Hugh Laurie. He then produced the ITV drama series Wish Me Luck about female secret agents in France during World War II which aired on ITV between 1988-1990.

In 1989 he became Head of Drama and Arts at Tyne Tees Television and was Executive Producer of the early Catherine Cookson adaptations, which ran on ITV with great success for a further decade or more.

In 1991 Chaplin moved to BBC Wales as Head of Programmes where he was responsible for transforming the BBC's output in English on both television and radio. By this time Chaplin had begun to write for Live Theatre, the acclaimed new writing company in Newcastle upon Tyne, collaborating first with Alan Plater on “In Blackberry Time” (1987-8)., a play about the life and work of his late father, Sid Chaplin.

His first credit on television was the ITV mini-series “Act of Betrayal” about an IRA super-grass on the run in Australia, co-written with his friend and former LWT colleague Nicholas Evans (author of The Horse Whisperer and other novels).

His first radio writing credit was “Hair In The Gate” (1990) for BBC Radio 4, based on a play of the same name staged at Live Theatre the year before.

In 1994, having just completed the acclaimed ITV mini-series Dandelion Dead directed by Mike Hodges and starring Michael Kitchen, about the notorious Hay on Wye poisoner Herbert Armstrong, Chaplin became a full-time writer and since then has chalked up many credits across various genres.

In TV he has created the original series Grafters (1998-9) starring Robson Green and Stephen Tomkinson for ITV; and for the BBC Drovers Gold (1997) about a group of Welsh cattle drovers in the 19th century; and then Monarch of the Glen (2000-2006) starring amongst others, Richard Briers and Susan Hampshire; the series ran for 69 episodes and has been screened in many countries around the world.

Chaplin also adapted novels by the crime writer Reginald Hill for four films in the BBC series Dalziel and Pascoe (one of these, “On Beulah Height”, won an Edgar Award from the Mystery Writers of America); and also P. D. James'  “Original Sin” for an ITV mini-series.

Other TV work includes the ITV drama screened in 2006 – “Pickles - The Dog Who Won The World Cup” and his TV adaption of Michelle Magorian’s novel Just Henry screened in 2011. Chaplin also worked on the BBC series Robin Hood and the ITV series Wild at Heart.

Chaplin's radio work for BBC Radio 4 encompasses single plays like “Hair In The Gate” (1990), “One-Way Ticket to Palookaville” (1992), and “The Song Thief” (2008), later adapted for the People's Theatre, Newcastle, during its centenary year in 2011. There were also seven contributions to “The Stanley Baker Baxter Playhouse” : “Flying Down to Greenock”, “Fife Circle” and  “A Dish of Neapolitan”, “The Pool” and “Melancholy Baby”. Chaplin created and wrote all 13 plays in the much loved series “Two Pipe Problems” (2006-2013) about life in a retirement home for faded theatricals with a Sherlock Holmes trope, starring Richard Briers and Stanley Baxter. This came to an end in 2013 following the death of Richard Briers.

Since returning to Newcastle in 2006 with his wife Susan Chaplin, a silversmith and teacher, Chaplin has written various books of non-fiction about the unique culture of the region, including “Come and See” (2011), an affectionate memoir of the beautiful Tyneside Cinema where Chaplin received his cinematic education in the late 60s. In 2013, “Tyne View - A Walk Around the Port of Tyne”, an exploration of the social history, culture and soul of the river, appeared with contributions from artist Birtley Aris, photographer Charles Bell, and poet Christy Ducker. Both books are published by New Writing North and in January 2014 “Tyne View” went into its 2nd edition. Chaplin has also contributed 20 story panels based on South Tyneside's maritime history to South Shields’ new library and resource centre, The Word. Chaplin has also edited two collections of the work of his father Sid Chaplin: “In Blackberry Time” published by Bloodaxe Books in 1987 and “Hame – My Durham” published by Mayfly Books in 2016 to mark the birth centenary of the author. The latter featured photographs by Karen Atkinson, idiosyncratic maps by the late artist Birtley Aris and an extended essay by Michael Chaplin on the social history of SW Durham, his father's so-called ‘heartland’.

Since writing his first stage play “In Blackberry Time” in 1987 (drawn from the book of the same name), Chaplin has written seven other full-length plays and sundry other shorter pieces for Live Theatre. These include two plays written with his son Tom about the travails of their football club Newcastle United, “You Couldn't Make It Up” and “You Really Couldn't Make It Up” (2009); “A Walk-On Part”, a dramatisation of the best-selling diaries of Chris Mullin MP, which also ran at the Soho Theatre and then the Arts Theatre, London (2011–12), and then the play with music “Tyne” based on Chaplin's book “Tyne View”, which enjoyed a sell-out run at Live, before proving equally popular at the Customs House, South Shields and then the Theatre Royal, Newcastle (2013–14). Almost all of Chaplin’s plays for Live Theatre were directed by Max Roberts, the theatre’s artistic director for more than 30 years.

Chaplin also worked as a co-writer of “Tommies”, a four-year project for BBC Radio 4 telling the story of the First World War from the point of view of a group of British Army signallers. The series ran from the autumn of 2014 until November 2018, with Chaplin writing a total of eight episodes.

In January 2015 Radio 4 began broadcasting a series of 13 plays by Chaplin with the generic title “The Ferryhill Philosophers” about the collision between moral philosophy and life in the small town in County Durham where Chaplin spent the first three years of his life. The series, starring Alun Armstrong as retired pitman Joe Snowball and Deborah Findlay as Durham University philosophy lecturer Hermione Pink, ran for 13 plays and proved very popular with listeners.  One of these plays, “Lies, Damn Lies and Conversational Implicature”, was performed live with the help of the Ferryhill Town Band at the Durham Book Festival in October 2016.

“For The Love of Leo”, a bittersweet comedy drama starring Mark Bonnar and set in Edinburgh (where Chaplin and wife Susan lived for five years), began running on Radio 4 in 2019 and was recommissioned for a further two series. As of January 2022 Chaplin plans to write one final series. In 2019 Chaplin also wrote an irreverent serial about the death of Queen Victoria based on the book by Stewart Richards called “Curtain Down at Her Majesty's”.

The great majority of Michael Chaplin’s radio plays were directed by his long-term collaborator (2006-2021), the late Marilyn Imrie, who contributed to them immeasurably.

In 2020 Chaplin wrote a 60 minute single play for Radio 4. titled “South On The Great North Road” shaped around a song of the same name by Sting). The playwright and singer/songwriter then collaborated on a 90 minute play with songs about the life of a musical life of a Newcastle family which will be going out in March 2022. Sting plays one of the characters in “I Must Have Loved You” as well as singing.

In August 2021 Chaplin published a memoir framed around one of his lifetime obsessions.. “Newcastle United Stole My Heart: 60 Years in Black And White” is published by Hurst Books and received much praise from fans, ex-players and sports journalists.

Chaplin has been a visiting professor at both Sunderland University (2007-2012) and Newcastle University (2016-2021). He was a writer-in-residence for the Port of Tyne from 2010 to 2015 and has served on the boards of various cultural organisations in the North-East, including Live Theatre, the Tyneside Cinema, the writers’ development agency New Writing North and the Amber/Side Trust.

Over the winter of 2019-20 Michael Chaplin and his musician cousin Gary Chaplin performed an entertainment based on the story of their family, told in readings, music, images, conversation ‘and cloth caps’. The cousins call themselves “The Bird Scarers”, after the first job of their great-great grandfather John, and hope to revive their collaboration in the future.

References

External links
The Ferryhill Philosophers at BBC Radio 4
Michael Chaplin on the Chaplin (Michael) Archive at Newcastle University
Chat with Michael Chapman about Monarch Of The Glen at BBC
Michael Chaplin on writing 'Tommies' at The Journal

1951 births
Alumni of Magdalene College, Cambridge
Living people
BBC executives
English television writers
English television producers
Edgar Award winners
People from County Durham
Academics of the University of Sunderland